The following lists events that happened during 1964 in the Grand Duchy of Luxembourg.

Incumbents

Events

January – March
 21 March – Representing Luxembourg, Hugues Aufray finishes fourth in the Eurovision Song Contest 1964 with the song Dès que le printemps revient.

April – June
 May – The Moselle canal is inaugurated by Grand Duchesse Charlotte, Charles De Gaulle, and Heinrich Lübke.
 7 June – Legislative elections are held.  In the Chamber of Deputies, the DP loses five seats, as the LSAP and KPL make progress at their expense.  The CSV is beaten in the popular vote for the first time, but remains the largest party by seats.

July – September
 15 July – Pierre Werner forms a new government, with the LSAP's Henry Cravatte replacing Eugène Schaus of the Democratic Party as Werner's deputy.
 21 July - Victor Bodson resigns from the Council of State to take up his seat in the Chamber of Deputies.

October – December
 12 November – Grand Duchesse Charlotte abdicates, and is succeeded by her son, Jean.

Births
 24 March - Agnès Durdu, member of the Council of State
 14 August – Jean-Louis Schiltz, politician
 10 October – Guy Hellers, footballer

Deaths
 14 March – Nicolas Majerus, jurist

Footnotes

References